Gordon Bailey Ingram (December 30, 1924 – November 4, 2004) was an American inventor and entrepreneur. Along with Mitchell WerBell III, he founded Military Armament Corporation. Ingram was the creator of the MAC-10 and MAC-11 machine pistols, and is widely credited with repopularizing the submachine gun.

Biography
Gordon B. Ingram was born in Los Angeles, California. His first foray into the weapons design world was during his years of service in the United States Army. He designed the Ingram Model 6 in 1949 and later went on to design and manufacture the MAC-10 and MAC-11. Ingram's role in the creation of the MAC-10 earned him the moniker "father of the machine pistol". His design accomplishments spanned over forty years and left behind several notable designs. His Ranchero and Durango series of rifles incorporated the concept of multiple-use weapons that all use not only the same pistol-caliber rounds but the associated magazines as well.

Ingram was also known for his associations with some of the US defense sector's most prominent figures, such as Mitchell WerBell III, who designed the suppressor for the MAC-10.

References

Footnotes

1924 births
2004 deaths
Firearm designers
Weapon design
Weapon designers
20th-century American inventors
United States Army personnel of World War II